Viktor Raskov (born May 8, 1984) is a Ukrainian former footballer who played as a forward. He is currently the head coach for FC Continentals in the Canadian Soccer League.

Career

Europe 
Raskov began his career in 2002 in the Ukrainian Second League with FC Chornomorets-2 Odesa and later signed with Dniester Ovdiopol. In 2005, he played in the Ukrainian First League with FC Arsenal Kharkiv, and with FC Stal Kamianske in 2006. The following season he went abroad to play in the A Lyga with FK Šiauliai. The remainder of his first tenure in Lithuania was spent with FK Kruoja Pakruojis. In 2010, he played in the III liga with MKP Pogoń Siedlce. After one season in Poland, he returned to Šiauliai, where he finished as the club's top goalscorer with eight goals. He featured in the 2010–11 UEFA Europa League against Wisła Kraków. He also played in the 2010–11 Baltic League.

Ukraine and Asia 
He returned to Ukraine in 2011 to sign with FC Helios Kharkiv. After several seasons with Helios, he signed with league rivals FC Avanhard Kramatorsk. He played abroad once again this time in the Uzbek League with FC Andijon throughout the 2014 season Following a brief stint in Central Asia, he returned to the Second League for the remainder of the season to play with FC Real Pharma Odesa.

Canada 
In 2017, he played overseas in the Canadian Soccer League with FC Vorkuta. For the 2019 season, he was transferred to the expansion franchise Kingsman SC. In 2020, he returned to Vorkuta and assisted in securing Vorkuta's second CSL Championship after defeating Scarborough SC.

Managerial career 
Raskov was selected as an assistant coach under head coach Andrei Malychenkov for FC Vorkuta for the 2021 CSL season. He assisted Vorkuta in clinching the regular-season title, and the ProSound Cup in 2021. He also helped Vorkuta to the CSL Championship final but was defeated by Scarborough. 

In 2022, Vorkuta was rebranded as FC Continentals and was subsequently named the head coach. He shortly after reverted to his former position as an assistant coach to Malychenkov. Raskov under Malychenkov's tenure would help guide the club to their third championship after defeating Scarborough.

Honors 
FC Vorkuta

 CSL Championship: 2020

References 

1984 births
Living people
Ukrainian footballers
Ukrainian football managers 
FC Chornomorets-2 Odesa players
FC Dnister Ovidiopol players
FC Arsenal Kharkiv players
FC Stal Kamianske players
FC Šiauliai players
MKP Pogoń Siedlce players
FC Helios Kharkiv players
FC Kramatorsk players
FC Real Pharma Odesa players
FC Continentals players
A Lyga players
Uzbekistan Super League players
Canadian Soccer League (1998–present) players
Association football forwards
Ukrainian First League players
Ukrainian Second League players
Expatriate footballers in Poland
Canadian Soccer League (1998–present) managers
Footballers from Odesa
III liga players